The Crow is an upcoming American supernatural superhero film directed by Rupert Sanders, from a screenplay by Zach Baylin. It stars Bill Skarsgård as Eric Draven / The Crow, a murdered musician who is resurrected to avenge the deaths of himself and his fiancée, played by FKA Twigs. Based on James O'Barr's comic of the same name, it serves as a remake of the 1994 film.

The film entered development in December 2008, with Stephen Norrington stating that he would write and direct a "reinvention" of The Crow. It entered a complicated production process with various directors, screenwriters, and cast members attached at various points. Filmmakers Norrington, Juan Carlos Fresnadillo, F. Javier Gutiérrez, and Corin Hardy were initially signed to direct while Bradley Cooper, Luke Evans, Jack Huston, and Jason Momoa were all cast as Eric Draven during various points in development. Skarsgård was cast as Draven in April 2022 and Sanders was hired to direct soon after. Filming began in July, with locations including Prague and Munich.

Cast
 Bill Skarsgård as Eric Draven / The Crow
 FKA Twigs as Eric's fiancée
 Danny Huston

Production

Development
On December 14, 2008, Stephen Norrington announced to Variety that he planned to write and direct a "reinvention" of The Crow. Norrington distinguished between the 1994 adaptation and his take: "Whereas Alex Proyas' original was gloriously gothic and stylized, the new movie will be realistic, hard-edged and mysterious, almost documentary-style." Ryan Kavanaugh then announced on November 23, 2009, that his company, Relativity Media, was in negotiations with Edward R. Pressman for both the film's rights and financing. In July 2010, Australian musician Nick Cave was brought in to revise the script. In October 2010, reports emerged that Mark Wahlberg was offered the lead role.

Norrington later stepped out of the project and, on April 7, 2011, it was announced that Juan Carlos Fresnadillo had been chosen to direct the film, which has since been regarded as a remake. Tucker Tooley of Relativity was chosen serve as executive producer, while Jose Ibanez, Jon Katz and Jesus de la Vega were to serve as co-producers. Meanwhile, Bradley Cooper was in talks to play the lead. F. Javier Gutiérrez was also in consideration to replace Norrington. It was reported on April 20, 2011, that the project was stalled due to a legal battle between Relativity's Ryan Kavanaugh and The Weinstein Company, who still retained the worldwide distribution rights to the series. In late June 2011, Relativity announced their plans to continue in mid-lawsuit and had tapped Alex Tse. In mid-August 2011, it was announced that Cooper had dropped out due to scheduling difficulties and Wahlberg was again up for the part, with additional rumors of Channing Tatum or Ryan Gosling possibly taking the role, as well as James McAvoy. In October 2011, it was reported that Fresnadillo had departed the project as well.

It was confirmed in January 2012 that Gutiérrez had signed on to direct the remake, with Edward R. Pressman, Ryan Kavanaugh and Jeff Most on producing duties. Jesse Wigutow was attached as screenwriter while Dan Farah would join Bob and Harvey Weinstein, and Tooley as executive producers. In June 2012, Pressman assured fans that "the original 1994 Crow film holds a special place in my heart. The current film is a 'reinvention' of James O'Barr's graphic novel for the 21st century. We're thrilled to have teamed with director Javier Gutiérrez and screenwriter Jesse Wigutow on this story, which remains true to the core of Eric Draven's plight for revenge. On the news of future remakes, however, O'Barr stated: "[...] I don't have great expectations. I think the reality is, no matter who you get to star in it, or if you get Ridley Scott to direct it and spend 200 million dollars, you're still not gonna top what Brandon Lee and Alex Proyas did in that first ten million dollar movie." Screenwriter Cliff Dorfman was enlisted for a page-one rewrite, which ultimately got the project greenlit. The director courted production designer Bo Welch, effects artist Rick Baker, musician Atticus Ross, and makeup designer Bill Corso for the film. On April 19, 2013, it was announced that Tom Hiddleston was in talks to play Eric. That same month, there were reports that Hiddleston would not be doing the film, but that Alexander Skarsgård was in talks for the part. A week later, however, Skarsgård stated that he was not attached to the film.

On May 4, 2013, Deadline reported that Luke Evans had been cast as Draven. Evans reaffirmed to Superhero Hype that the film would be as faithful as possible to the original. On July 3, 2013, The Crows creator James O'Barr was named as the creative consultant of the film. In an October 2015 interview, O'Barr would discuss what had changed his mind about the reboot, and efforts to make the reboot a more faithful adaptation of the comic book, while remaining respectful to the original film. On November 21, 2013, Schmoes Know had reports that Norman Reedus was up for the role of a character named "James", and that Kristen Stewart had at one time been considered for the part of Shelly. Location scouting took place in New Orleans, Louisiana and later in the United Kingdom. In July 2014, Gutiérrez signed on to the film Rings (2017), which would force him to later drop out of directing the film. In November 2014, O'Barr announced he was co-writing the screenplay with Cliff Dorfman. In December 2014, the studio hired Corin Hardy to direct the film. Evans told Den of Geek in an interview that he might not do the film, and it was later revealed that Evans has dropped out of the film due to other projects. On February 9, 2015, O'Barr told Blastr in an interview that he was interested in Sam Witwer for the role.

As of October 24, 2014, the film was set to start production in the spring of 2015. On February 25, 2015, it was reported that Jack Huston was in talks to star in the film. On March 14, 2015, O'Barr confirmed to Dread Central at the Lexington Comic and Toy Convention that Huston had been cast as Draven in the reboot, and at a Q&A during the convention he further confirmed that Jessica Brown Findlay had been cast as Shelly Webster. On May 20, 2015, Deadline reported that Andrea Riseborough was in talks to co-star as the female version of Top Dollar. On June 15, 2015, Variety reported two stories: Forest Whitaker was in negotiations for a role and Huston had dropped out due to scheduling conflicts, but Relativity Studios were looking at Nicholas Hoult and Jack O'Connell for the role of Draven. On July 31, 2015, The Hollywood Reporter reported that production on the reboot stalled because of Relativity Media's bankruptcy. O'Barr told ComicBook.com in an interview that the film would still happen.

TheWrap reported that filming on the reboot was going to start in March 2016 with Hardy on board as director. On June 15, 2016, Deadline reported that Hardy returned to the reboot. On August 10, 2016, Jason Momoa posted a photo of himself with Hardy on his Instagram account. On September 6, 2016, TheWrap reported that Momoa was cast and filming was set to begin in January 2017. On November 17, 2016, the film was retitled to The Crow Reborn, with The Hollywood Reporter reporting that Highland Film Group and Electric Shadow have acquired the rights to finance, produce, and distribute the film from Relativity but may lose both Momoa and Hardy. In September 2017, it was announced that Sony Pictures would distribute the film. In March 2018, the film was slated for a release date of October 11, 2019. On May 31, 2018, it was announced that both director Hardy and star Momoa had exited the project. Production was expected to begin later that year in Budapest. On social media, Hardy revealed that he had creative differences with the rights holder Samuel Hadida of Davis Films, and that leaving the film was the "hardest decision of all".

In November 2019, Proyas said in an interview on a podcast of a reboot:

Pre-production
In January 2020, the film was revived and development resumed. In March 2022, Pressman reaffirmed that the film was still on track. The following month, Rupert Sanders and Zach Baylin were announced as director and writer, while Edward R. Pressman and Malcolm Gray co-produced. On April 1, 2022, it was announced by The Hollywood Reporter that Bill Skarsgård, whose brother Alexander was formerly in talks for the lead role, would star as Eric Draven. In the same month, it was reported that FKA Twigs would star as Eric's fiancée, while Victor Hadida, Molly Hassell, and John Jencks joined as producers.

Filming
Principal photography commenced on July 13, 2022 in Prague, Czech Republic. Paperwork filed from the film's production falsely identified the project as a six-episode television series. Filming was previously set to commence in June 2022, shooting in Prague and Munich. By August 26, 2022, Danny Huston, whose nephew Jack was previously cast as Draven in March 2015, was cast in an undisclosed role. On September 16, 2022, the film wrapped production.

Post-production
In September 2022, virtual production on the film occurred at Penzing Studios, in Penzing, Germany, while the digital asset creation and VFX work occurred in Bavaria, Germany. The film is the first major international production to shoot at the studio. By November 2022, Ashland Hill Media had financed the film's post-production.

Release
The international distribution rights to The Crow were shopped to various buyers at the 2022 Cannes Film Festival in May 2022.

References

External links
 

Upcoming films
American action thriller films
American films about revenge
American neo-noir films
American superhero films
American vigilante films
Dark fantasy films
Davis Films films
Demons in film
Films based on Image Comics
Films directed by Rupert Sanders
Films shot in Munich
Films shot in Prague
Gothic fiction
Heaven and hell films
IDW Publishing adaptations
Live-action films based on comics
Resurrection in film
The Crow films
The Devil in film
Upcoming English-language films